The 2010–11 San Jose State Spartans men's basketball team represented San Jose State University during the 2010–11 NCAA Division I men's basketball season. The Spartans, led by sixth-year head coach George Nessman, played their home games at the Event Center Arena and were members of the Western Athletic Conference. They finished the season 17–16, 5–11 in WAC play, to finish eighth in the conference. However, San Jose State upset Idaho and Hawaii in the WAC tournament before losing the semifinal round to Utah State and earned an invitation to the  College Basketball Invitational for San Jose State's first postseason appearance since making the 1996 NCAA tournament.

Preseason roster changes

Departures

Incoming transfers

Roster

Schedule
Source:

|-
!colspan=9  style=| Exhibition
  
|-
!colspan=9 style=|Regular Season

|-
!colspan=9 style=| WAC tournament

|-
!colspan=9 style=| CBI

References

External links
Media guide 

San Jose State Spartans men's basketball seasons
San Jose State
San Jose State
San Jose State Spartans men's basketball team
San Jose State Spartans men's basketball team